Cercospora longipes is a fungal plant pathogen.

References

longipes
Fungal plant pathogens and diseases